Dolce Amore is a 2016 Philippine romantic drama television series directed by Mae Cruz-Alviar, Richard I. Arellano, and Cathy Garcia-Molina, starring Liza Soberano and Enrique Gil. The series premiered on ABS-CBN and worldwide on The Filipino Channel on February 15, 2016, replacing Pangako Sa 'Yo.

The story is about Serena (Liza Soberano), a rich, sophisticated, and beautiful Italian bella; and Tenten (Enrique Gil), a poor and hardworking Manila boy who will do anything for his family, and how their worlds collide as they search for identity and love.

Dolce Amore aired its last episode on August 26, 2016, with a total of 137 episodes aired.

Series overview

Episode list and Ratings 
In the tables below, the  represent the lowest ratings and the  represent the highest ratings.

Chapter 1

February

March

April

Chapter 2

May

June

July

Chapter 3

July

August

References

Lists of Philippine drama television series episodes